Everything Will Never Be OK is the debut album by the rock band Fiction Plane. The track "Wise" contains the hidden track "Bongo" after five minutes of silence (making the track's total running time 15:50).

Track listing 
All songs written by Fiction Plane.

 "Listen to My Babe" – 2:43
 "Everything Will Never Be OK" – 3:20
 "Cigarette" – 3:28
 "Hate" – 3:35
 "Soldier Machismo" – 2:39
 "I Wish I Would Die" – 3:38
 "Fallow" – 4:09
 "Real Real" – 3:57
 "Everybody Lies" – 3:24
 "Sickness" – 3:53
 "Silence" – 3:21
 "Wise" – 4:00 / "Bongo" (hidden track) – 6:50

Personnel
 Joe Sumner – vocals, guitar, additional drums
 Dan Brown – bass, backing vocals, keyboards
 Seton Daunt – guitar
 Abe Laboriel Jr. - drums

References

2003 debut albums
Albums produced by David Kahne
Fiction Plane albums